Rivett (postcode: 2611) is a residential suburb of Canberra, Australian Capital Territory, Australia, established in the late 1960s. It is situated on the western edge of the Weston Creek district.

Rivett takes its name from Sir David Rivett, the professor of Chemistry at the University of Melbourne (1924–1927), deputy chairman and chief executive officer of the Council for Scientific and Industrial Research (CSIR, 1927–1946), chairman of the council of CSIRO (1946–1949), and president of Australian and New Zealand Association for the Advancement of Science (1937–1939).

Streets in Rivett are named after Australian flora.

Several homes in Rivett were burnt, and many residents evacuated during the 2003 Canberra bushfires.

Suburb amenities

Shops
The Rivett local shopping centre is located at Rivett Place (off Bangalay Crescent). The centre contains a supermarket, newsagency, hairdresser, a cafe, therapeutic masseuse and bakery.

Educational institutions
Rivett Preschool is located in Nealie Place off Bangalay Crescent. There are no non-government schools or colleges in Rivett.

Places of worship
The Reformed Church of Canberra of the Christian Reformed Churches of Australia is located behind the shopping centre off Rivett Place.

Health facilities
The Burrangiri Respite Services day care for elderly people near the shopping centre.

Transport
ACTION buses run regular services to Rivett. Route 64 services most of Rivett and links to Chapman, Cooleman Court and Woden Town Centre.

No other public transportation is available, apart from taxis.

Open spaces
Rivett has extensive open spaces with playing fields on the western side of the suburb across from the shopping centre, several neighbourhood parks and pedestrian parkland weaving through the suburb.

Geology

Deakin Volcanics red-purple and green grey rhyodacite with spherulitic texture cover most of Rivett except for Laidlaw Volcanics grey tuff on the southernmost quarter. Quaternary alluvium covers the center.

Notes and references

External links

 Weston Creek Community Council (includes map of area)
Canberra history

Suburbs of Canberra